This is a list of presidents of Iraq since the formation of the Iraqi Republic in 1958.

List of officeholders

Timeline

See also
 List of kings of Iraq
 President of Iraq
 Vice President of Iraq
 Prime Minister of Iraq
 List of prime ministers of Iraq

References

Government of Iraq
 
Iraq, List of presidents of
Presidents